This is an incomplete list of shopping malls in Taiwan, sorted by city. Opening year is given in parentheses. As of June 2022, there are 111 malls on this list.

Taipei

 Asiaworld Mall (1990)
 ATT 4 FUN (2011) 
 ATT e Life (2018)
 BELLAVITA Shopping Center (2009)
 Breeze A1 Airport MRT Station
 Breeze Academia Sinica (2018)
 Breeze Center (2001)
 Breeze Nan Jing (2013)
 Breeze Nanshan (2019)
 Breeze NTU Hospital (2014)
 Breeze Song Gao (2014)
 Breeze Taipei Station (2007)
 Breeze TSG Hospital (2015)
 Breeze Xinyi (2015)
 Citylink Nangang (2014)
 Citylink Neihu (2018)
 Citylink Songshan (2012)
 Chun Place (2020) 
 Core Pacific City (2001)
 CTBC Financial Park Mall (2013)
 Dayeh Takashimaya (1994)
 East Metro Mall (2002) 
 Far Eastern Plaza Mall (1993)
FEDS Xinyi A13 (2020)
 Global Mall Nangang Station (2016)
 Guang Hua Digital Plaza (1973)
 Longshan Temple Underground Shopping Mall (2005)
 Ming Yao (1987)
 Miramar Entertainment Park (2004)
 Neo19 (2001)
 Qsquare (2009)
 Station Front Metro Mall (2004)
 Syntrend Creative Park (2015)
 Taipei 101 Mall (2004)
 Taipei City Mall (2000)
 TM Midtown (2017) 
 Urban One (2010)
 Ximen Metro Mall (2002)
 Zhongshan Metro Mall (1999)

New Taipei
 ASE WeMall (2018)
 Beyond Plaza (2000)
 City Plaza (2015)
 Crown Plaza (2016) 
 Global Mall Banqiao Station (2010)
 Global Mall Linkou A9 (2017)
 Global Mall Zhonghe (2005)
 Honhui Plaza (2020)
 iFG Farglory Square (2015)
 Marina Bay Plaza (2011)
 Mega City (2012)
 Miranew Square (2019)
 Mitsui Outlet Park Linkou (2016)
 Nan Shan Power Center (2003)
 Sanzaru Plaza (2014) 
 Shine Square (2015)
 Showtime Live Shulin (2018)
 St. Ignatius Plaza (2012)

Taoyuan City
 Global Mall Taoyuan A8 (2015)
 Global Mall Taoyuan A19 (2021)
 Gloria Outlets (2015)
 Landmark Life Plaza (2017)
 MetroWalk Shopping Center (2001)
 TaiMall Shopping Center (1999)
 Tonlin Plaza (1995)

Hsinchu City
 Big City (2012)
 Global Mall Hsinchu (2013)
 J.Piin Mall (2016)
 Taroko Square (2018)

Zhubei
 6+Plaza (2018)
 FEDS Zhubei (2022)

Taichung
 ASEAN Square (1990)
 Chungyo (1992)
 Dadun11 (2016)
 JMall (2011)
 Lihpao Outlet Mall (2017)
 Mitsui Outlet Park Taichung (2018)
 Park Lane by CMP (2008)
 Park Lane by Splendor (2012)
 Showtime Live Taichung Station (2017)
 Showtime Live Taichung Wenxin (2018)
 Sunshine Plaza Outlet (2008)
 Taroko Mall (2001)
 Tech Mall (2005)
 Tiger City (2002)
 Top City (2011)

Chiayi City
 Nice Plaza (2006)
 Showtime Live Chiayi (2016)

Tainan
 Mitsui Outlet Park Tainan (2022)
 Sugar Mall (2003)
 T.S. Mall (2015)

Kaohsiung
 Dollars Mall (1991)
 Dream Mall (2007)
 E-Da Outlet Mall (2010)
 E Sky Mall (2021)
 Global Mall Xinzuoying Station (2013)
 Hanshin Arena Shopping Plaza (2008)
 Joy Plaza (2019)
 Lovego Plaza (2022)
 Taroko Park (2016)
 Treasure Island Shopping Center (1999)

Elsewhere
 Global Mall Pingtung (2012) in Pingtung City, Pingtung County
 Keelung E-Square (2003) in Keelung
 Luna Plaza (2008) in Yilan City, Yilan County
 MOYA Sparkle Shopping Mall (2001) in Keelung
 Pescadores Mall (2013) in Magong City, Penghu County
 Pier 3 (2018) in Magong City, Penghu County
 Shang Shun Mall (2015) in Toufen, Miaoli County
 Showtime Live Taitung (2013) in Taitung City
 Urban Shopping Plaza (2022) in Yilan City, Yilan County
 Wind Lion Plaza (2014) in Jinhu, Kinmen

References

Taiwan
Shopping malls